The Dover Slave Quarter Complex is a set of five historic structures located on Brookview Farm near Manakin-Sabot, Goochland County, Virginia. They were built as one-story, two-unit, brick structures with steep gable roofs for housing African-American slaves. The center dwelling had a frame second-story added and its brick walls covered by siding when it was converted to an overseer's house. It has a recent rear addition.

In addition to the center dwelling, one of the former slave dwellings serves as the farm office, one serves as a woodworking shop, and the remaining two are used for storage. Also on the farm are the two early 20th-century contributing farm structures; one is an impressively long dairy barn, and there are two tenant houses, silos, and storage buildings.

The structures were listed as a group on the National Register of Historic Places in 2002.

References

African-American history of Virginia
Farms on the National Register of Historic Places in Virginia
Houses on the National Register of Historic Places in Virginia
Houses in Goochland County, Virginia
National Register of Historic Places in Goochland County, Virginia